Anthony Keith "Tiger" Jones (born May 21, 1982) is a former American football wide receiver who played eight seasons in the Arena Football League (AFL). He played college football at Louisville. He was a member of the Washington Redskins (2005), and was in Training Camp with the Philadelphia Eagles (2012).

Professional career

Philadelphia Eagles
Jones signed with the Philadelphia Eagles on July 22, 2012. He was released in August 2012.

Philadelphia Soul
Jones was named to his 2nd First Team All-Arena team as a member of the Philadelphia Soul in 2013.

Jacksonville Sharks
On February 16, 2015, Jones was assigned to the Jacksonville Sharks. On October 19, 2015, Jones was once again assigned to the Sharks. He retired in January 2017.

References

External links
Philadelphia Eagles bio
Philadelphia Soul bio
Louisville Cardinals bio

1982 births
Living people
Sportspeople from Mobile, Alabama
Players of American football from Alabama
American football wide receivers
Louisville Cardinals football players
Louisville Fire players
Georgia Force players
Milwaukee Iron players
Dallas Vigilantes players
Philadelphia Soul players
Jacksonville Sharks players